Malahat is the name of a Coast Salish group on southern Vancouver Island, British Columbia, Canada.  Their name today may refer to:

Government
 Malahat First Nation, the First Nations band government of the Malahat located on southeastern Vancouver Island

Places
 Malahat, British Columbia, an unincorporated area of Vancouver Island, Canada
 Malahat railway station, in Malahat, British Columbia, Canada
 Malahat-Juan de Fuca, a former electoral district Legislative Assembly of British Columbia

Transportation
 Malahat (highway), a portion of British Columbia Highway 1 linking Greater Victoria to the rest of Vancouver Island
 Malahat (schooner), a five-masted ship also known as "The Queen of Rum Row"
 Malahat (train), now known as the Victoria–Courtenay train, a passenger service on Vancouver Island operated by Via Rail

Military
 , a recruitment and training center for sailors of the Canadian Naval Reserve in Victoria, BC